Ovens railway station was located on the Bright line serving the town of Ovens in Victoria. It opened on 17 October 1890 and closed on 30 November 1983.

References

Disused railway stations in Victoria (Australia)
Railway stations in Australia opened in 1890
Railway stations closed in 1983